Walt Disney's Comics and Stories, sometimes abbreviated WDC&S, is an American anthology comic book series featuring characters from The Walt Disney Company's films and shorts, including Donald Duck, Scrooge McDuck, Mickey Mouse, Chip 'n Dale, Li'l Bad Wolf, Scamp, Bucky Bug, Grandma Duck, Brer Rabbit, Winnie the Pooh, and others. With more than 700 issues, Walt Disney's Comics & Stories is the longest-running Disney comic book in the United States, making it the flagship title, and is one of the best-selling comic books of all time.

The book was originally published by Dell Comics (1940–1962), and there have been many revivals over the years, continuing the same legacy numbering. The revivals have been published by Gold Key Comics (1962–1984), Gladstone Publishing (1986–1990), Disney Comics (1990–1993), back to Gladstone Publishing (1993–1999), Gemstone Publishing (2003–2008), Boom! Studios (2009–2011) and IDW Publishing (2015–2020).

Publication history

The precursor to WDC was Mickey Mouse Magazine, published in several incarnations from 1933 to 1940. WDC itself was launched in October 1940, and initially consisted of reprints taken from the Disney comic strips Mickey Mouse, Donald Duck, and Silly Symphonies, reformatted for comic books and colored. The first original story created for WDC was an adaptation of The Flying Gauchito, illustrated by Walt Kelly, in issue No. 24 (August 1942).

To facilitate birthday and holiday gift giving to youngsters, Western Publishing offered to send subscription recipients illustrated letters that announced the gift. Various premiums were also offered for new subscribers, including a mini-poster attributed to Pogo creator Walt Kelly advertised on the back cover of issue No. 100 (Jan. 1949). Walt Kelly would do the cover art for many issues between No. 34 and No. 118 and provided interior art for issues # 34–41 and 43.

The anthology format usually began with a 10-page story featuring Donald Duck and for most of the run ended with a serial or single story featuring Mickey Mouse. The most popular issues featured the Donald Duck 10-pagers written and drawn by Carl Barks, who began the run with issue No. 31 (April 1943) and ended with original stories in issue No. 312 (September 1966), but have been continually reprinted. Almost all of these stories co-starred Donald's nephews, Huey, Dewey, and Louie, with frequent guest appearances by Barks' most famous creation, Scrooge McDuck, as well as the Beagle Boys, Gyro Gearloose, and Gladstone Gander.

Many 1940s issues featured Mickey Mouse serials by Floyd Gottfredson which were reprinted from newspaper daily comic strips; later, Paul Murry took over drawing original Mickey Mouse serials, with stories written by Carl Fallberg and Don Christensen among others. The 1980s saw numerous Murry reprints; the 1990s and more recent times saw new Mickey Mouse stories by Noel Van Horn and (usually only drawn by) Cesar Ferioli, as well as some Gottfredson serials not previously anthologized in comic book format.

Li'l Bad Wolf stories began in issue No. 52 (January 1945) and remained a regular feature for more than ten years, continuing to appear in the majority of issues even after the continuous run stopped. Carl Buettner (1945–1946), Gil Turner (1948–1956), and Dick Matena (2005–2008) are generally regarded as the most notable Wolf creators featured in the title. In the 2000s, Big Bad Wolf often supplanted his son as title character of the stories.

Bucky Bug stories began in issue No. 20 (May 1942) with a series of newspaper reprints; original Bucky stories started a while later, in issue No. 39 (December 1943). Bucky stories were monthly through 1950, were not seen for several decades, then returned on an occasional basis from 1988 onwards, with a mixture of old and new material.

By the mid-1950s, Walt Disney's Comics and Stories was the best selling comic book in the United States, with a monthly circulation of over three million. Mark Evanier described the high circulation as the product of "an aggressive subscription push."

In many 1980s issues, as well as scattered issues from 2006 onward, new Donald Duck stories by Daan Jippes and/or Freddy Milton would lead off the title. Issues No. 523, 524, 526, 528, 531, and 547 (all 1987–1990) featured lead-off stories drawn (and usually written) by Don Rosa, while most issues published between 1993 and 2005 featured lead-offs by William Van Horn.

After reaching its 600th issue, the title converted to prestige format and remained that way until the end of Gemstone's run at issue No. 698.

In September 2009, with the publishing rights of the "core four" comics being moved to Boom! Studios, the comic was cut down to 24 pages per issue and began focusing on printing multi-part story arcs that would run for about four issues each, the first being the infamous Ultraheroes arc (which would be concluded in its own series that ran for eight issues). As with all of Boom!'s Disney comics, each issue had at least two different variant covers, though this was eventually stopped at issue No. 709. At the start of 2011, to celebrate the comic's 70th anniversary, Walt Disney's Comics and Stories returned to its original anthology format. However, due to The Incredibles comic book being cancelled on a cliffhanger the previous year, coupled with Disney having acquired Marvel Comics two years earlier, Disney opted not to renew their deal with Boom! Studios, forcing Boom! to abruptly end their run with the title at issue No. 720. It was later announced that their first issue of Walt Disney's Comics and Stories would be published on July 22, 2015. Similar to the Boom! issues, each of IDW's issues were published with at least two different variant covers, with at least one cover being based on Disney theme parks and attractions in the first year.

Under IDW, issue No. 726 featured the first appearance of Oswald the Lucky Rabbit in the series.

To make room for the inclusion of the localized Duck Avenger title in the line, Walt Disney's Comics and Stories switched to bimonthly publication in July 2016, alternating with Duck Avenger each month. Due to IDW's Disney line expanding to include Tangled and DuckTales in July 2017, Walt Disney's Comics and Stories switched to quarterly publication from that point onward. It switched back to monthly publication when its name was shortened to Disney Comics and Stories in September 2018.

Unlike the other three "core four" comics, Walt Disney's Comics and Stories retained its original numbering system when IDW launched its Disney line. However, when the book's title was shortened, IDW inexplicably restarted the numbering system as if it were a new series. The I.N.D.U.C.K.S. website, however, refers to IDW's later issues as being part of the preceding run.

Publishing history

Notable stories

The following is a list of notable stories that had their first American printings in an issue of Walt Disney's Comics and Stories.

Numbering
While the issues are now referred to with sequential numbers, the format for the first ten years of the comic was to use the volume and number. Each volume contained 12 issues thus issue No. 13 (October 1941) was labeled "Vol. 2 No. 1" and included several stories about superstitions, especially about the number 13. The title started using whole numbers with issue No. 124, in January 1951.

Publishers
The publishers of Walt Disney's Comics and Stories have been:
 Dell Comics (Oct 1940 – Aug 1962) #1–263
 Gold Key Comics (Sept 1962 – 1984) #264–510
 Gladstone Publishing (Oct 1986 – April 1990) #511–547
 Disney Comics (June 1990 – July 1993) #548–585
 Gladstone Publishing (Aug 1993 – Feb 1999) #586–633
 Gemstone Publishing (June 2003 – November 2008) #634–698
 Boom Kids! (Boom! Studios) (September 2009 – June 2011) #699–720
 IDW Publishing (July 2015–July 2020) #721–756

Circulation
The first issue of Walt Disney's Comics and Stories sold 252,000 copies. By issue No. 23 (August 1942), the comic was printing 1,000,000 copies per issue. They reached 2 million copies by issue No. 66 (March 1946) and 3 million by issue No. 131 (August 1951). The magazine hit its peak at 3,115,000 copies of issue No. 144 (September 1952).

Collections
Between 1984 and 1990, Another Rainbow Publishing collected all of Carl Barks's Disney comics as The Carl Barks Library. Gladstone Publishing released further reprints of Barks's stories in the 1990s.

In 2011, KaBOOM! published the first volume of an Archives series collecting issues from the beginning of the comic's run. In 2018, IDW released an anthology of its stories.

See also
 Other Disney comics titles in the US:
 Mickey Mouse Magazine (1935–1940)
 Donald Duck (1942–2017)
 Mickey Mouse (1943–2017)
 Uncle Scrooge (1952–2020)
 Walt Disney Comics Digest (1968–1976)
 Uncle Scrooge Adventures (1987–1997)
 Mickey Mouse Adventures (1990–1991)
 Donald Duck Adventures (1988–1998)
 Walt Disney Giant (1995–1996)

References

External links 

Walt Disney's Comics and Stories on Disney Comics Worldwide (DCW)
Cover of all issues of Walt Disney's Comics and Stories on outducks.org (click on issue numbers)

Gold Key Comics titles
Dell Comics titles
Gemstone Publishing titles
IDW Publishing titles
Disney Comics titles
Disney comics titles
Comics magazines published in the United States
Comics based on films
1940 comics debuts
Magazines established in 1940
Magazines disestablished in 2020